The National Assessment Group (NAG) is an agency of the United States Department of Defense providing engineering, technical and assessment support for the Department of Defense (DoD) and other government agencies. NAG clients include the Office of the Secretary of Defense, Combatant Commands (CCMDs) and other Joint organizations, the individual Services, and other federal government agencies. They require independent assessment services, to support programmatic decisions on accelerated schedules. NAG assessments cover a variety of areas and systems. Each assessment is tailored to meet client needs. Many projects consist of independent, rapid assessments to research, demonstrate, and evaluate system capabilities, technical parameters, threats and vulnerabilities. The systems assessed can vary from those in the initial stages of development to those ready for operational deployment.

The National Assessment Group operates out of Kirtland Air Force Base in New Mexico.

External links
 NAG Facebook Site

References

United States Department of Defense agencies